Cristoforo Numai (died 23 March 1528) was an Italian Franciscan, who became minister general of the Friars Minor and a cardinal.

Life
A nativ eof Forlì, his date of birth is uncertain. In his youth he studied at Bologna and, after joining the Friars Minor, was sent to complete his studies at Paris. In 1507 he was elected vicar provincial of his order at Bologna, in 1514 vicar general of the Cismontane Franciscan families, and in 1517 he became minister general of the whole order of Friars Minor. Less than a month later he was raised, in spite of his protests, to the cardinalate by Pope Leo X, who in presence of the Sacred College paid a splendid tribute to Christopher's great learning and prudence and to his still greater holiness of life.

In 1520 he became Bishop of Alatri and Bishop of Isernia in Italy, and in 1526 Bishop of Riez in Provence. He subsequently fulfilled the office of Apostolic legate to the King of France, and later became Apostolic nuncio and commissary for the construction of the Vatican Basilica, being then invested with the temporal dominion of Bertinoro.

During the Sack of Rome (1527) by the soldiers of the Duke of Bourbon, Christopher suffered many hardships and insults, on account of which he received letters of condolence from Pope Clement VII, Francis I of France, and Henry VIII of England. He took refuge in Ancona, but died the next year as a consequence of the inflicted injuries. His remains were transferred back from Ancona to Rome, and placed in the Church of Ara Coeli.

Works

Besides an Exhortatio ad Galliarum regem Franciscum I in Turcas and a number of letters addressed to that king and the other rulers concerning the liberation of Clement VII, Christopher is said by Luke Wadding and others to have written several treatises on theological and ascetical questions, all of which appear to have perished during the sacking of Rome.

References

Sources

Luke Wadding, Annales Minorum ad annum 1517, XVI, nn. xxiv and xxxv
Sbaralea, Supplementum, Pt. I (1908), 207
Picconi, Cenni biografice sugli uomini illustri della francescana provincia di Bologna, I (1894), 380.

1528 deaths
16th-century Italian cardinals
Franciscan cardinals
Franciscan bishops
Bishops of Riez
Year of birth unknown
Ministers General of the Order of Friars Minor
People from Forlì